Vieno Johannes Sukselainen's first  cabinet was the 41st government of Republic of Finland. Cabinet's time period was from April 27, 1957, to November 29, 1957. It was Minority government.

 

Sukselainen, 1
1957 establishments in Finland
1957 disestablishments in Finland
Cabinets established in 1957
Cabinets disestablished in 1957